Scott Hull may refer to:

 Scott Hull (musician) (born 1971), American grindcore musician
 Scott Hull (mastering engineer) (born 1962), mastering engineer based in New York City